Stadion im. Edmunda Szyca is a ruined multi-purpose stadium in Poznań, Poland, named after Edmund Szyc, one of the founders of Warta Poznań. The stadium opened in 1929 during the "Comprehensive National Exhibition" (Powszechna Wystawa Krajowa) and had a capacity of 60,000 people. It is the historical home of football team Warta Poznań.

References 

Multi-purpose stadiums in Poland
Football venues in Poznań
Sports venues in Greater Poland Voivodeship
Edmunda Szyca, Stadion
Buildings and structures in Poznań